Centaurea eriophora is a species of Centaurea found in Spain in  Los Alcores, Litoral onubense, Campiña Baja, Campiña Alta,  Portugal (Algarve), and North Africa.

References

External links

eriophora